Osman Güneş (born 1952, Yozgat, Turkey) is a Turkish bureaucrat. In accordance with Article 114 of the Constitution of the Republic of Turkey, he has served as neutral Minister of Interior till the 2007 general elections.

He graduated from Ankara University.

References

1952 births
Living people
Ministers of the Interior of Turkey
Ankara University alumni
Members of the 60th government of Turkey